There are fifteen universities in Scotland and three other institutions of higher education that have the authority to award academic degrees. 

The first university college in Scotland was founded at St John's College, St Andrews in 1418 by Henry Wardlaw, bishop of St Andrews. St Salvator's College was added to St Andrews in 1450. The University of Glasgow was founded in 1451 and King's College, Aberdeen in 1495. St Leonard's College was founded in St Andrews in 1511 and St John's College was re-founded as St Mary's College, St Andrews in 1538, as a Humanist academy for the training of clerics. Public lectures that were established in Edinburgh in the 1540s, would eventually become the University of Edinburgh in 1582. After the Reformation, Scotland's universities underwent a series of reforms associated with Andrew Melville. After the Restoration there was a purge of Presbyterians from the universities, but most of the intellectual advances of the preceding period were preserved. The Scottish university colleges recovered from the disruption of the civil war years and Restoration with a lecture-based curriculum that was able to embrace economics and science, offering a high-quality liberal education to the sons of the nobility and gentry.

In the eighteenth century the universities went from being small and parochial institutions, largely for the training of clergy and lawyers, to major intellectual centres at the forefront of Scottish identity and life, seen as fundamental to democratic principles and the opportunity for social advancement for the talented. Many of the key figures of the Scottish Enlightenment were university professors, who developed their ideas in university lectures. At the beginning of the nineteenth century, Scotland's five university colleges had no entrance exams. Students typically entered at ages of 15 or 16, attended for as little as two years, chose which lectures to attend and left without qualifications. There was a concerted attempt to modernise the curriculum to meet the needs of the emerging middle classes and the professions. The result of these reforms was a revitalisation of the Scottish university system and growth in the number of students. In the first half of the twentieth century Scottish universities fell behind those in England and Europe in terms of participation and investment. After the Robbins Report of 1963 there was a rapid expansion in higher education in Scotland. By the end of the decade the number of Scottish universities had doubled. In 1992 the distinction between universities and colleges was removed, creating a series of new universities.

All Scottish universities are public and funded in part by the Scottish Government (through its Scottish Funding Council). In 2021–22, approximately 301,000 students studied at universities or institutes of higher education in Scotland, 82,440 of which are international students. The sector employs, directly and indirectly, six per cent of all jobs in the Scottish economy.

History

Middle Ages

Until the fifteenth century, Scots who wished to attend university had to travel to England or to the Continent. This situation was transformed by the founding of St John's College, St Andrews in 1418 by Henry Wardlaw, bishop of St. Andrews. St Salvator's College was added to St. Andrews in 1450. The other great bishoprics followed, with the University of Glasgow being founded in 1451 and King's College, Aberdeen in 1495. Initially, these institutions were designed for the training of clerics, but they would increasingly be used by laymen. International contacts helped integrate Scotland into a wider European scholarly world and would be one of the most important ways in which the new ideas of Humanism were brought into Scottish intellectual life in the sixteenth century.

Early modern era
St Leonard's College was founded in Aberdeen in 1511 and St John's College was re-founded as St Mary's College, St Andrews in 1538, as a Humanist academy for the training of clerics. Public lectures that were established in Edinburgh in the 1540s would eventually become the University of Edinburgh in 1582. After the Reformation, Scotland's universities underwent a series of reforms associated with Andrew Melville, who was influenced by the anti-Aristotelian Petrus Ramus. In 1617 King James VI decreed that the town college of Edinburgh should be known as King James's College. In 1641, the two colleges at Aberdeen were united by decree of Charles I (r. 1625–49), to form the "King Charles University of Aberdeen." Under the Commonwealth (1652–60), the universities saw an improvement in their funding. After the Restoration there was a purge of Presbyterians from the universities, but most of the intellectual advances of the preceding period were preserved. The colleges at St. Andrews were de-merged. The five Scottish university colleges recovered from the disruption of the civil war years and Restoration with a lecture-based curriculum that was able to embrace economics and science, offering a high-quality liberal education to the sons of the nobility and gentry.

Eighteenth century

In the eighteenth century the universities went from being small and parochial institutions, largely for the training of clergy and lawyers, to major intellectual centres at the forefront of Scottish identity and life, seen as fundamental to democratic principles and the opportunity for social advancement for the talented. Chairs of medicine were founded at all the university towns. By the 1740s Edinburgh medical school was the major centre of medicine in Europe and was a leading centre in the Atlantic world. Access to Scottish universities was probably more open than in contemporary England, Germany or France. Attendance was less expensive and the student body more representative of society as a whole. The system was flexible and the curriculum became a modern philosophical and scientific one, in keeping with contemporary needs for improvement and progress. Scotland reaped the intellectual benefits of this system in its contribution to the European Enlightenment. Many of the key figures of the Scottish Enlightenment were university professors, who developed their ideas in university lectures. Key figures included Francis Hutcheson, Hugh Blair, David Hume, Adam Smith, James Burnett, Adam Ferguson, John Millar and William Robertson, William Cullen, James Anderson, Joseph Black and James Hutton.

Modern era

At the beginning of the nineteenth century, Scotland's five university colleges had no entrance exam, students typically entered at ages of 15 or 16, attended for as little as two years, chose which lectures to attend and left without qualifications. The curriculum was dominated by divinity and the law and there was a concerted attempt to modernise the curriculum, particularly by introducing degrees in the physical sciences and the need to reform the system to meet the needs of the emerging middle classes and the professions. The result of these reforms was a revitalisation of the Scottish university system, which expanded to 6,254 students by the end of the century and produced leading figures in both the arts and sciences. In the first half of the twentieth century Scottish universities fell behind those in England and Europe in terms of participation and investment. After the Robbins Report of 1963 there was a rapid expansion in higher education in Scotland. By the end of the decade the number of Scottish Universities had doubled. New universities included the University of Dundee, Strathclyde, Heriot-Watt, and Stirling. From the 1970s the government preferred to expand higher education in the non-university sector and by the late 1980s roughly half of students in higher education were in colleges. In 1992, under the Further and Higher Education Act 1992, the distinction between universities and colleges was removed, creating new universities at Abertay, Glasgow Caledonian, Napier, Paisley and Robert Gordon.

Present

Organisation

There are fifteen universities in Scotland and three other institutions of higher education which have the authority to award academic degrees. The University of the Highlands and Islands (UHI) gained full university status in 2011, having been created through the federation of 13 colleges and research institutions across the Highlands and Islands, a process that began in 2001.

All Scottish universities have the power to award degrees at all levels: undergraduate, taught postgraduate, and doctoral. Education in Scotland is controlled by the Scottish Government under the terms of the Scotland Act 1998. The minister responsible for higher education is the Cabinet Secretary for Education and Skills, currently Shirley-Anne Somerville of the Scottish National Party. University status in Scotland and throughout the United Kingdom today is conferred by the Privy Council which takes advice from the Quality Assurance Agency for Higher Education.

Funding and finances
All Scottish universities are public universities and part funded by the Scottish Government (through its Scottish Funding Council) and financial support is provided for Scottish-domiciled students by the Student Awards Agency for Scotland. Students ordinarily resident in Scotland do not pay tuition fees for their first undergraduate degree, but tuition fees are charged for those from the rest of the United Kingdom. All students are required to pay tuition fees for postgraduate education (e.g. MSc, PhD), except in certain priority areas funded by the Scottish Government, or if another source of funding can be found (e.g. research council studentship for a PhD). A representative body called Universities Scotland works to promote Scotland's universities, as well as six other higher education institutions.

The total consolidated annual income for the fifteen Scottish universities for 2020–21 was £4.38 billion of which £847 million was from research grants and contracts, with an operating surplus of £290.4 million (6.63%). £1.36 billion was received from the Scottish Funding Council via grants and £298.5 million was received from tuition fees of Home-domiciled students, defined as Scotland-domiciled students and European Union-domiciled students who began their studies prior to 2021-22. The table below is a record of each Scottish university's financial data for the 2020–21 financial year as recorded by the Higher Education Statistics Agency:

Students

In the 2021–22 academic year, 301,230 students studied at universities or institutes of higher education in Scotland, 232,080 of which were full-time, 59.1% were female and 40.9% male. 61% of students were domiciled in Scotland, 12% from the rest of the United Kingdom, and the remaining 27% being international students (6% from the European Union). Of all these, approximately 204,465 were studying at undergraduate level, 83,065 for a taught postgraduate degree (primarily a master's degree) and 13,705 for a postgraduate research degree (primarily PhD). The three largest universities by enrolment were the Universities of Glasgow (42,980 students), Edinburgh (41,250 students) and Strathclyde (25,715 students).

Scottish Universities Summer Schools in Physics
The Scottish Universities Summer School in Physics (SUSSP) was established in 1960 by the four ancient Scottish Universities (Aberdeen, Edinburgh, Glasgow and St. Andrews) to contribute to the dissemination of advanced knowledge in physics and the formation of contacts among scientists from different countries through the setting up of a series of annual summer schools of the highest international standard.  it had increased to include Dundee, Glasgow Caledonian, Heriot-Watt, Paisley, and Strathclyde.

Rankings

In the 2023 national league table rankings, five of the top twenty in both of The Guardian University Guide and in The Times/Sunday Times Good University Guide were Scottish universities. In the 2023 global rankings, three Scottish universities featured in the world's top 200 universities in both of the QS and the Times Higher Education World University Rankings.

In terms of rankings there are four distinctive clusters of higher and lower status universities in the UK: Oxbridge comprising cluster one; a second cluster containing the remaining 22 Russell Group universities together with 17 other old universities, including Aberdeen, Dundee, Edinburgh, Glasgow, Heriot-Watt, St Andrews, Stirling and Strathclyde; a third cluster containing 13 old universities and 54 new universities including the remaining Scottish universities; and a fourth cluster contains 19 new universities but no Scottish universities.

Research Excellence Framework

The below lists the outcome of the latest Research Excellence Framework undertaken in 2021 (the next REF is scheduled for 2028) by the four UK higher education funding bodies. The quality of research was rated 4* (world leading), 3* (internationally excellent), 2* (recognised internationally), 1* (recognised nationally) and unclassified. GPA measures the quality of research and Research Power is calculated by the GPA score of a university multiplied by the full-time equivalent number of researchers submitted. The rankings are out of 129 institutions as measured by output:

See also
List of universities in Scotland
List of universities in the United Kingdom
Universities in the United Kingdom

Notes